The 1974 Montreal municipal election took place on 10 November 1974, to elect a mayor and city councillors in Montreal, Quebec, Canada. Longtime mayor Jean Drapeau was re-elected to another four-year term in office.

Elections were also held one week earlier in suburban communities on the Island of Montreal.

Results
Mayor

Council (incomplete)

Results in Suburban Communities (incomplete)

Montreal North

References

1974 Quebec municipal elections
Municipal elections in Montreal
1970s in Montreal
1974 in Quebec
November 1974 events in Canada